Mycosphaerella juglandis is a fungal plant pathogen.

See also
List of Mycosphaerella species

References

juglandis
Fungal plant pathogens and diseases
Fungi described in 1984